Jeff Povey is a Scottish screenwriter and author, best known for his extensive work in British television.

Career
After his two-man play Tidy, Povey started writing television since the early 1990s, with Stay Lucky. He has written multiple episodes of long running continuing dramas, such as Casualty, its spinoff Holby City, and EastEnders,. 

Other television series, covering a wide array of genres, he wrote for include children's drama The Dumping Ground, action-adventures Hooten and the Lady and The Musketeers, and crime series such as Silent Witness, Kingdom and Midsomer Murders. In 2002, he directed the short film Blowing It.

In 2006 his first novel, The Serial Killers Club, was published. In 2014 his second novel (part of a trilogy) "SHIFT", was published. The second book in the trilogy was published on 23 April 2015, titled "DELETE". On 23 March 2017 the final book titled “ESCAPE” was released, concluding the trilogy.

References

External links

Interview at channel4.com

Blowing It screenplay at channel4.com

Year of birth missing (living people)
Living people
People from Hitchin
People from Bridge of Allan
21st-century English novelists
British soap opera writers
British television writers
British male novelists
English screenwriters
English male screenwriters
English television producers
English soap opera writers
English male novelists
British male television writers
21st-century British screenwriters
21st-century English male writers